Marissa Ponich (born May 1, 1987) is a Canadian fencer from Edmonton, Alberta.

She competed at the Pan American Games in 2015 and in 2019, where she won a bronze medal in the team sabre event.

She competed at the Pan American Fencing Championships where she won a bronze medal in the individual sabre event in 2017; bronze medals in the team sabre event in 2013 and 2016; and competed in 2014, 2015 and 2018. Ponich also competed at the World Fencing Championships in 2013, 2014, 2015, 2016, 2017 and 2018.

References

1987 births
Living people
Canadian female fencers
Fencers at the 2015 Pan American Games
Fencers at the 2019 Pan American Games
Pan American Games medalists in fencing
Pan American Games bronze medalists for Canada
Sportspeople from Edmonton
Medalists at the 2019 Pan American Games
21st-century Canadian women